Vincenzo Aloi (born  September 22, 1933) is an American mobster involved in stock fraud who briefly served as the acting boss of the Colombo crime family. Vincenzo was also a figure in the Third Colombo War alongside his brother Benny.

Made man to acting boss
Vincenzo Aloi is the son of the former Profaci caporegime, Sebastian "Buster" Aloi. He is the brother of mobster Benedetto "Benny" Aloi, a former underboss of the family. Vincent Aloi is the godson of Gambino crime family patriarch, Carlo Gambino. No other details of his early life are available.

On November 19, 1970, Aloi was indicted on stock fraud charges involving the illegal takeover of an investment firm in Miami, Florida. However, on December 23, 1971, Aloi was acquitted on all charges.

On June 28, 1971, boss Joseph Colombo was shot at an Italian American Anti-Defamation League rally in Manhattan. Colombo survived, but in a vegetative state. Carmine Persico and his family essentially took control of the family after the Colombo shooting. However, unlike Colombo, Persico preferred to hide behind figurehead bosses. At this point, Persico designated either Aloi or mobster Joseph Yacovelli as the front boss for the Colombo family.

In 1972, after giving his men permission to kill Joey Gallo in a Manhattan restaurant, Yacovelli fled New York out of fear of reprisals from the Gallo crew. Later in 1973, Aloi definitely became acting boss because Persico had been sentenced to 10 years in federal prison on hijacking charges.

On June 26, 1973, Aloi was convicted of perjury in state court. Prosecutors had charged that Aloi lied to a grand jury when he claimed to have not visited a Colombo family safe house in Nyack, New York, before the murder of Joe Gallo. He was later sentenced to seven years in state prison. However, after numerous court appeals, Aloi's perjury conviction was overturned in federal court.

On December 22, 1973, Aloi was convicted for stock fraud involving an automobile leasing company. On February 5, 1974, Aloi was sentenced to nine years in federal prison.  Aloi was incarcerated at the Allenwood Federal Penitentiary in Pennsylvania. Now that Aloi was also in prison, Persico demoted him from acting boss back to capo.

Senior family member 
In the early 1980s, Aloi was paroled from prison, returning to his crew in the Brooklyn faction of the Colombo crime family.

In 1991, Aloi sided with Colombo underboss Victor Orena in his bloody rebellion against the imprisoned Persico. However, there is no evidence that Aloi had a direct role in the conflict, and Persico allowed him to remain as caporegime when the Third Colombo War ended in 1993. Later in the decade, Persico appointed Aloi and his brother Benedetto as acting consiglieres.

During the mid-1990s, Gambino crime family capo Nicholas "Little Nick" Corozzo became involved in a dispute over the DeCavalcante crime family of New Jersey inducting Manhattan residents. A meeting was called to resolve the problem and Aloi attended it as the Colombo representative. It was decided in the meeting that the DeCavalcante crime family could no longer induct associates outside of New Jersey and South Philadelphia.

As of December 2008, Vincenzo Aloi was residing in Florida and is today assumed to be in retirement.

References
Notes

Sources
United States Congress. House Appropriations Committee. Departments of State, Justice, and Commerce, the Judiciary, and Related Agencies Appropriations for the Fiscal Year. 1975. 
Civil Liberties, and the Administration of Justice United States Congress. House Committee on the Judiciary. Subcommittee on Courts. Witness Protection Program: Hearings Before the Subcommittee on Administrative Practice and Procedure of the Senate Committee on the Judiciary. 1985. 
United States Congress. Senate Committee on Governmental Affairs. Permanent Subcommittee on Investigations. Organized Crime: 25 Years After Valachi : Hearings Before the Permanent Subcommittee on Investigations of the Committee on Governmental Affairs. 1988. 
United States Congress. House Committee on Commerce. Subcommittee on Finance and Hazardous Materials. Organized Crime on Wall Street: Hearing Before the Subcommittee on Finance and Hazardous Materials. 2000. 

Further reading
Sifakis, Carl. The Mafia Encyclopedia: Third Edition. Checkmark Books; 3 edition (June 30, 2005) 
Capeci, Jerry. The Complete Idiots Guide to the Mafia. Indianapolis, Alpha, Alpha; 2 edition (January 2005) 
Raab, Selwyn. Five Families: The Rise, Decline, and Resurgence of America's Most Powerful Mafia Empires. New York: St. Martin Press, 2005. 

 

1933 births
Living people
American gangsters of Italian descent
Colombo crime family
Gangsters from New York City
Acting bosses of the Five Families
Consiglieri
American people convicted of fraud